Deshamanya Al-Haj  Badi-ud-din Mahmud (23 June 1904 – 16 June 1997) was a Sri Lankan politician. He served ten years as Minister of Education and two years as the Minister of Health and Housing.

Early life 

Badi-ud-din Mahmud was born in Matara, a town in the south of Sri Lanka. He was born into one of the most distinguished Sri Lankan Moor families of that time as the youngest of twelve siblings. His father was S.L.M. Mahmud Naina Marikkar Mathicham, better known as Matara Mahatmaya, who was an affluent planter and landed proprietor; Badi-ud-din Mahmud's mother was Fathima Natchiya. Mahmud was educated in his childhood at St. Thomas' College, and Wesley College, Colombo. He completed his higher education at Zahira College, Colombo, with the completion of his Cambridge Senior Examination. At Zahira College, he took interest in literature, tennis, and athletics. 

He was raised in a strictly religious atmosphere with traditional Islamic values. However, his family produced a liberal atmosphere.

Muslim League 

He first joined the All-Ceylon Muslim League{ in 1927 as a secretary. Originally a small movement, in three months it grew into the most powerful Muslim organization in Ceylon. The All-Ceylon Muslim League helped unite Muslim leaders such as Tuan Burhanudeen Jayah who were previously at odds with each other. Mahmud was also dedicated to social work. 

He delivered the first talk on Radio Ceylon during the festival of Hajj, organizing the recital of Takbir to precede his speech. He also initiated the Hajj prayers at Galle Face Green in 1928, which have become an annual feature, and engaged in the promotion of a public mass meeting at Galle Face Green to celebrate the birthday of Muhammad.

Aligarh Muslim University 

Mahmud was further educated at Aligarh Muslim University from 1931 to 1937. He excelled in both academics and extracurricular activities.

His most prominent achievements include ranking second in the Inter-Arts Examination in the First Division, and obtaining a B.A. as the top performer in the examination. Some of his other accomplishments were the gold medal of the All-India Public Speaking Competition, the Aligarh – The Oxford Meston Prize in 1937 for outstanding debating ability, and being appointed editor of the university's magazine for two successive years. In 1935, he was unanimously elected president of the U.P. University Students Federation. He presided over the All-India Students Conventions at Lucknow and organized the All-India Students Movement.

Mohammad Habib, a professor and provost of Mahmud, described his pupil:

While he was enrolled at Aligarh, Mahmud persuaded Muslim leaders in the Second Round Table Conference at London to support the Indian independence movement; the people that he persuaded included Shaukat Ali, Muhammad Ali Jinnah, Muhammad Iqbal, Mukhtar Ahmed Ansari, Muhammad Shafi, Zafar Ali Khan, Syed Mahmud, Bacha Khan, Mirza Ismail, and Syed Sultan Ahmed.

Reforms 

On Mahmud's arrival in Sri Lanka from Aligarh, the Muslim League organized a highly attended reception to him. Well-known figures at the meeting included Mohamed Macan Markar, T. B. Jayah, and N.H.M. Abdul Cader.

In 1938, Badi-ud-din Mahmud gave a speech at the birthday celebrations of Muhammad at Galle Face Green. He urged the Muslims of Sri Lanka to learn the Sinhala language because it would be the only official language after Sri Lanka became independent. His prediction was correct. Mahmud furthered his reasoning:

The Muslim community received his proposal negatively.

In the same year, Badi-ud-din Mahmud organized one of the largest demonstrations of the time among Muslims, a mass rally at Galle Face Green in support of the Arabs in Palestine. He delivered a speech to urge the government of Britain to fulfill its promises to Arabs in Palestine.

He helped develop an independent school called Zahira College in Gampola as the first principal. Under his leadership, it grew from a small school consisting of four classrooms, a shed, 67 students, and five teachers to a school that serves the entirety of Sri Lanka with up-to-date facilities. In 1960, Zahira College enrolled over 2000 students. Mahmud developed a uniform of pajamas, frocks, and a dupatta (scarf) for girls at Zahira College; it is now widely accepted in Muslim schools in Sri Lanka but was at first rejected by most. In the classroom, he introduced traditional Islamic cultural activities, which also evoked opposition at first.

References

External links
Mahmud, Badiuddin (Dr. Al Haj) M.P.

1904 births
1997 deaths
Deshamanya
Housing ministers of Sri Lanka
Members of the 6th Parliament of Ceylon
Members of the 7th Parliament of Ceylon
Sri Lankan Moor politicians
Indian independence activists
People from Matara, Sri Lanka